Michael Phillip Austin is Divisional Fellow of Sustainable Ecosystems at CSIRO in Canberra, Australia.  He was elected as a Foreign Member of the Linnean Society (London) in 1997, and received the Gold Medal from the Ecological Society of Australia in 1995.

References

Living people
Australian ecologists
Australian environmentalists
CSIRO people
Year of birth missing (living people)
Place of birth missing (living people)